Christopher William "Chris" Gitsham (15 October 1888 – 16 June 1956) was a South African athlete, who mainly competed in the men's marathon.

Gitsham competed for South Africa at the 1912 Summer Olympics held in Stockholm, Sweden where he won the silver medal in the men's marathon event. He also competed in the marathon at the 1920 Summer Olympics, but did not finish.

References

1888 births
1956 deaths
Sportspeople from Pietermaritzburg
South African male long-distance runners
South African male marathon runners
Olympic silver medalists for South Africa
Athletes (track and field) at the 1912 Summer Olympics
Athletes (track and field) at the 1920 Summer Olympics
Olympic athletes of South Africa
Colony of Natal people
Medalists at the 1912 Summer Olympics
Olympic silver medalists in athletics (track and field)